MV East Chop is a ferry in Massachusetts that operates between Hyannis and the islands of Martha's Vineyard and Nantucket.

She is powered by two diesel engines which drive two propellers.

She was purchased by Hy-Line Cruises in 1970 and is marketed with the name "Around the Sound".  She derives her name from East Chop, a residential area of the Town of Oak Bluffs on Martha's Vineyard.

References

Ferries of Massachusetts
Transportation in Barnstable County, Massachusetts
Transportation in Dukes County, Massachusetts
Transportation in Nantucket, Massachusetts